Metisella congdoni is a butterfly in the family Hesperiidae. It was described by de Jong and Kielland in 1983. It is found in southern Tanzania.

References

Endemic fauna of Tanzania
Butterflies described in 1983
Heteropterinae